Garfield Bulldogs may refer to:
The mascot of Garfield Senior High School (Los_Angeles)
The mascot of James A. Garfield High School (Seattle)